Sainte-Austreberthe ("Saint Austrebertha") is the name of two communes in France:
 Sainte-Austreberthe, Pas-de-Calais
 Sainte-Austreberthe, Seine-Maritime